This Band is an indie pop rock band based in Las Piñas, Philippines. They are best known for their sleeper hit single "Kahit Ayaw Mo Na." The official music video for the song reached 22 million views, and the official lyric video reached 6.5 million views.

Career
In 2017, This Band started performing as a band at KM17 Place and several food parks in Las Piñas. The band went through various male singers before finding Andrea Manzano whose voice is being compared to KZ Tandingan. Andrea used to sing for a Christian band in her local church before joining the band. Later on, they released their first single, "Kahit Ayaw Mo Na". Their next single, "Hindi Na Nga", reached 17 million views on YouTube.

Members

Current members 

 Andrea Manzano – lead vocals (2017–present)
 Euwie Von Loria – guitar, backing vocals (2017–present)
 Miccael Galvan – bass guitar (2017–present)
 John Kenneth Macaranas – drums (2017–present)
 Melvin Carson – keyboard, backing vocals (2018–present)
 Raymart Gubat – lead guitar (2018–present)

Discography

Singles

As lead artist

Promotional singles

Soundtrack appearances

Awards & nominations

References

External links
 Official Facebook Page

2018 establishments in the Philippines
Filipino pop music groups
Filipino rock music groups
Musical groups established in 2018
Musical groups from Metro Manila
Female-fronted musical groups